USS Kittery (AK-2) was a German passenger liner of the Hamburg America Line that was built in 1905 as D/S Präsident. The United States Navy took her over in 1918, renamed and commissioned her as a troopship and military cargo transport in World War I. She was transferred to the United States Shipping Board in 1933 and scrapped in 1937.

Acquiring a captured German freighter
Schichau Seebeckwerft of Bremerhaven built Präsident, launching her on 30 November 1905. Hamburg America Line operated her in the West Indies and Caribbean.

After the outbreak of World War I, she was suspected of supplying German cruisers in the Leeward Islands. Following several cruises, during which she narrowly avoided capture by English and French ships, she entered the port of San Juan, Puerto Rico, early in 1915 and was interned with two other German merchant ships. After the United States entered the war in April 1917, the US Navy took her over on the authority of President Woodrow Wilson's Executive Order 2619-A of 14 May 1917. She was commissioned as USS Kittery 6 July at Philadelphia, Pennsylvania.

World War I North Atlantic service
Assigned to cargo and troop transport service between the United States and the West Indies, Kittery left Philadelphia on 18 July. Operating out of Charleston, South Carolina, she made monthly trips during the remainder of the war to supply US forces.

Post-war operations
After the war she continued cargo service from Charleston and Norfolk, Virginia, for more than 15 years, making scores of runs to West Indian ports. After a final trip to Guantanamo Bay Naval Base, Port-au-Prince, and Cap-Haïtien, she arrived Norfolk 21 December 1932. She left on 28 January 1933 and reached Philadelphia two days later.

Decommissioning
Kittery decommissioned on 5 April, and her name was struck from the Navy List 11 April 1933. She was transferred to the United States Shipping Board 26 June 1933 and scrapped in 1937.

Military awards and honors
Kittery's crew members were authorized the following medals:
 World War I Victory Medal (with Transport Clasp)

References

External links
 NavSource Online: Service Ship Photo Archive - AK-2 Kittery
 Photo gallery at Naval Historical Center

1905 ships
Cargo ships of the United States Navy
Passenger ships of Germany
Ships built in Bremen (state)
Ships of the Hamburg America Line
Steamships of Germany
Steamships of the United States
Troop ships of the United States
World War I cargo ships of the United States